Multishow ao Vivo is a special series aired by Brazilian TV station Multishow.

 Multishow ao Vivo: Dois Quartos
 Multishow ao Vivo: Ivete no Maracanã
 Multishow ao Vivo: Ivete Sangalo no Madison Square Garden
 Multishow ao Vivo: Skank no Mineirão
 Multishow ao Vivo: Vanessa da Mata